Edward William Peters (12 June 1897 – 22 June 1980) was an Australian politician. Born in Melbourne, he attended Catholic schools before becoming a clerk with the Victorian Public Service. He was president of the Victorian branch of the Clerks' Union and in 1934 was President of the Victorian Labor Party. In 1949, he was elected to the Australian House of Representatives as the Labor member for the new seat of Burke. He held the seat until 1955, when it was abolished; Peters contested the new seat of Scullin and was successful, defeating member for Hoddle Jack Cremean, whose seat had also been abolished, running for the Australian Labor Party (Anti-Communist). He held the seat until 1969, when it was abolished, and Peters retired. He died in 1980.

References

Australian Labor Party members of the Parliament of Australia
Australian public servants
Members of the Australian House of Representatives for Burke (1949–1955)
Members of the Australian House of Representatives for Scullin
Members of the Australian House of Representatives
1897 births
1980 deaths
20th-century Australian politicians